Princeton Township was a township in Mercer County, New Jersey, United States, that existed from 1838 until it was dissolved after it was merged with Princeton Borough in 2013 to form Princeton, New Jersey. As of the 2010 United States Census, the township's population was 16,265, reflecting an increase of 238 (+1.5%) from the 16,027 counted in the 2000 Census, which had in turn increased by 2,829 (+21.4%) from the 13,198 counted in the 1990 Census.

Princeton was incorporated as a township by an act of the New Jersey Legislature on April 9, 1838, from portions of West Windsor Township in Mercer County and Montgomery Township in Somerset County. The Borough of Princeton — created on February 11, 1813 within the area that later became Princeton Township — became a fully independent municipality circa 1894. Portions of territory were ceded to the Borough of Princeton on January 4, 1928 and August 21, 1951. On November 8, 2011, voters in Princeton Township voted to consolidate with Princeton Borough, a change that took effect on January 1, 2013.

The Institute for Advanced Study, a private research institution that has been an academic home to Albert Einstein, Kurt Gödel, and many other famous and prize-winning scientists, is located in the former township. Princeton University is located mostly within the former borough, but parts of the campus extended  into what was Princeton Township.

Drumthwacket, the official residence of the governor of New Jersey, is located at 344 Stockton Street in the area of the former township.

The last day Princeton Township existed as an independent municipality was December 31, 2012.

Geography
According to the United States Census Bureau, the township had a total area of 16.520 square miles (42.786 km2), including 16.090 square miles (41.672 km2) of it is land and 0.430 square miles (1.114 km2) of water (2.60%) is water.

Princeton Borough was an independent municipality completely surrounded by the township.

Princeton North was an unincorporated community located within Princeton Township that had been a census-designated place until the 2010 Census.

The Princeton Airport is within Princeton's postal district but is situated less than a mile across the Somerset County border, in Montgomery Township.

Demographics

Census 2010

The Census Bureau's 2006-2010 American Community Survey showed that (in 2010 inflation-adjusted dollars) median household income was $107,071 (with a margin of error of +/- $12,828) and the median family income was $149,948 (+/- $16,625). Males had a median income of $112,282 (+/- $7,079) versus $66,150 (+/- $11,617) for females. The per capita income for the borough was $71,050 (+/- $6,509). About 6.2% of families and 7.7% of the population were below the poverty line, including 6.1% of those under age 18 and 6.2% of those age 65 or over.

Census 2000
As of the 2000 United States Census there were 16,027 people, 6,044 households, and 4,357 families residing in the township.  The population density was 978.2 people per square mile (377.8/km2).  There were 6,224 housing units at an average density of 379.9 per square mile (146.7/km2).  The racial makeup of the township was 79.91% White, 5.32% African American, 0.12% Native American, 9.98% Asian, 0.05% Pacific Islander, 2.11% from other races, and 2.51% from two or more races. Hispanic or Latino of any race were 5.28% of the population.

There were 6,044 households, out of which 34.1% had children under the age of 18 living with them, 63.3% were married couples living together, 7.2% had a female householder with no husband present, and 27.9% were non-families. 20.6% of all households were made up of individuals, and 8.2% had someone living alone who was 65 years of age or older.  The average household size was 2.57 and the average family size was 2.98.

In the township the population was spread out, with 24.4% under the age of 18, 5.1% from 18 to 24, 27.4% from 25 to 44, 27.7% from 45 to 64, and 15.4% who were 65 years of age or older.  The median age was 41 years. For every 100 females, there were 93.6 males.  For every 100 females age 18 and over, there were 90.6 males.

The median income for a household in the township was $94,580, and the median income for a family was $123,098. Males had a median income of $77,845 versus $41,563 for females. The per capita income for the township was $56,360.  About 4.2% of families and 5.7% of the population were below the poverty line, including 5.7% of those under age 18 and 3.0% of those age 65 or over.

As of the 2000 Census, Princeton Township was the 25th-wealthiest community in the state of New Jersey with a per capita money income of $56,360 as of 1999, an increase of 41.7% from the $39,767 recorded in 1989 when it was ranked 21st in the state.

Government

Local government 
Princeton Township was governed under the Township form of government with a five-member Township Committee. The Township Committee was elected directly by the voters in partisan elections to serve three-year terms of office on a staggered basis, with one seat coming up for election each year. A Mayor and Deputy Member were elected by the Committee from among its members and serve a one-year term. The Mayor served as the Chairperson of the Committee and exercised executive powers vested in the Mayor's Office by law. All legislative powers were assigned to the Committee. 104 of the 565 municipalities in New Jersey operate with a five-member Committee form of local government.

An Administrator was also empowered by ordinance to serve in an executive capacity and direct the Township's day-to-day operations.

Members of the final Princeton Township Committee were Mayor Chad Goerner (D, term ends December 31, 2012), Deputy Mayor Liz Lempert (D, 2013), Lance Liverman (D, 2013), Bernard P. Miller (D, 2014) and Sue Nemeth (D, 2014).

Merger of Borough and Township 
On November 8, 2011, the residents of both the Borough of Princeton and the Township of Princeton voted to merge the two municipalities into one. In Princeton Borough 1,385 voted for, 902 voted against while in Princeton Township 3,542 voted for and 604 voted against. Proponents of the consolidation measure asserted that when the merger is completed, the new municipality of Princeton will save $3.2 million as a result of some scaled-down services, including layoffs of 15 government workers, including 9 police officers (however, the measure itself does not create any line item cost reduction or layoffs).  Opponents to the consolidation measure asserted that cost savings alleged by a widely circulated report were incorrect and/or unsubstantiated and that individual voter representation would be diluted by the merged municipal structure. The consolidation is to take effect in 2013.

Federal, state and county representation 
Princeton Township was located in the 12th Congressional district and was part of New Jersey's 16th state legislative district. Prior to the 2011 reapportionment following the 2010 Census, Princeton Township had been in the 15th state legislative district.

Politics
As of March 23, 2011, there were a total of 11,488 registered voters in Princeton Township, of which 5,691 (49.5%) were registered as Democrats, 1,520 (13.2%) were registered as Republicans and 4,263 (37.1%) were registered as Unaffiliated. There were 14 voters registered to other parties.

In the 2008 presidential election, Democrat Barack Obama received 75.3% of the vote here (6,963 cast), ahead of Republican John McCain with 20.7% (1,914 votes) and other candidates with 1.1% (103 votes), among the 9,247 ballots cast by the township's 12,423 registered voters, for a turnout of 74.4%. In the 2004 presidential election, Democrat John Kerry received 70.6% of the vote here (6,276 ballots cast), outpolling Republican George W. Bush with 25.8% (2,295 votes) and other candidates with 1.0% (111 votes), among the 8,894 ballots cast by the township's 11,190 registered voters, for a turnout percentage of 79.5.

In the 2009 gubernatorial election, Democrat Jon Corzine received 66.1% of the vote here (3,867 ballots cast), ahead of Republican Chris Christie with 26.9% (1,576 votes), Independent Chris Daggett with 5.8% (342 votes) and other candidates with 0.5% (29 votes), among the 5,854 ballots cast by the township's 11,777 registered voters, yielding a 49.7% turnout.

Education

Colleges and universities
Part of Princeton University, including most of the athletic facilities, was in the township.  Most university buildings were in the borough.  The rest of the university's land is across Carnegie Lake in West Windsor Township.

The Princeton Theological Seminary and the Institute for Advanced Study were in the township.

Westminster Choir College was located mainly in the borough; a small part was in the township.

Mercer County Community College served residents of the township.

Primary and secondary schools

Public schools

For grades K through 12, public school students attend the Princeton Regional Schools, a regional school district shared with Princeton Borough that also serves students from Cranbury Township, as part of a sending/receiving relationship. Schools in the district (with 2010-11 enrollment data from the National Center for Education Statistics) are 
Community Park Elementary School (grades K-5, 321 students; located in Princeton Township), 
Johnson Park Elementary School (K-5, 372; Princeton Township), 
Littlebrook Elementary School (K-5, 335; Princeton Township), 
Riverside Elementary School (K-5, 276; Princeton Township), 
John Witherspoon Middle School (6-8, 664; Princeton Township) and 
Princeton High School (9-12, 1,420; Borough of Princeton).

The Princeton Charter School, located in the township, opened in September 1997 and serves students from the borough and township who are selected by lottery from among applicants.

Private schools
Several private schools are located in the Township, including the American Boychoir School, Hun School of Princeton, Princeton Academy of the Sacred Heart, Princeton Day School, Princeton Friends School, and Stuart Country Day School.

Public libraries 
The Princeton Public Library, located in the borough, serves the borough and the township.  The library was entirely rebuilt in 2004 at its downtown location at the corner of Witherspoon Street and Wiggins Street and opened its doors in April of that year.

Points of interest
 The site of the Mercer Oak, against which the dying General Hugh Mercer rested while his men around him continued to fight the Battle of Princeton in 1777.  The oak is the emblem of Princeton Township and appears on the seal of Mercer County.  The tree died in 2000, and one of its saplings now grows in its place.
 The Washington Oak - 275+ year-old white oak overlooking Princeton Battlefield State Park on the spot where British and American forces first saw each other.
 Delaware and Raritan Canal - runs along the Stony Brook and the eastern bank of Carnegie Lake.
 Stony Brook Meeting House and Cemetery - historic sites of 18th century meeting house and burial site of Richard Stockton (signer of the Declaration of Independence) and Governor of New Jersey Charles Smith Olden.
 Drumthwacket - official residence of the governor of New Jersey

Sister cities
  Comune di Pettoranello del Molise, Molise, Italy.
 Colmar, Alsace France

See also
Town Topics

References

External links
Official township web site
Princeton Regional Schools

Data for the Princeton Regional Schools, National Center for Education Statistics

1838 establishments in New Jersey
2012 disestablishments in New Jersey
Former municipalities in Mercer County, New Jersey
Former townships in New Jersey
Populated places established in 1838
Populated places disestablished in 2012
Princeton, New Jersey